Robert Virot (10 August 1915 in Paris; 10 March 2002 Le Buisson-de-Cadouin, Dordogne), was a French botanist.

He obtained a doctorate in science from Paris University in 1956.
He lived in New Caledonia from 1936 to 1947. He then returned to France were here worked for the CNRS at the Muséum national d'histoire naturelle

His PhD thesis published as "La végétation canaque" in 1956 is one of the first major ecological studies of the flora of New Caledonia. He also wrote taxonomic monographs of Proteaceae and Epacridaceae (=Ericaceae) from New Caledonia as parts of the series flore de la Nouvelle-Calédonie.

References

 Morat P (2010) Les botanistes collecteurs en Nouvelle-Calédonie de 1774 à 2005. Adansonia 32:239–249
 Virot R (1956) La végétation canaque. Faculté des Sciences de l’université de Paris, Paris
 Virot R (1967) Protéacées. In: Aubréville A (ed) Flore de la Nouvelle-Calédonie et Dépendances, volume 2. Muséum National d’Histoire Naturelle, Paris.
 Virot R (1975) Epacridacées. In: Aubréville A, Leroy JF (eds) Flore de la Nouvelle-Calédonie et Dépendances, volume 6. Muséum National d’Histoire Naturelle, Paris.

20th-century French botanists
1915 births
2002 deaths
University of Paris alumni